Kleiton Domingues Barbosa, known simply as Kleiton Domingues, (born 2 April 1988) is a Brazilian professional footballer, who most recently played for Treze as an attacking midfielder.

He is Leandro Domingues' brother, who is also a footballer.

Club statistics

Notes

References

External links
 
 UOL Esporte 
 
 Kleiton Domingues at playmakerstats.com (English version of ogol.com.br)
 

1988 births
Living people
Brazilian footballers
Brazilian expatriate footballers
Esporte Clube Vitória players
Ituano FC players
Guaratinguetá Futebol players
Guarani FC players
Agremiação Sportiva Arapiraquense players
Tokushima Vortis players
FC Gifu players
Capivariano Futebol Clube players
Boa Esporte Clube players
Esporte Clube Taubaté players
Associação Portuguesa de Desportos players
Fluminense de Feira Futebol Clube players
Treze Futebol Clube players
J1 League players
J2 League players
Campeonato Brasileiro Série B
Campeonato Brasileiro Série C
People from Vitória da Conquista
Association football midfielders
Brazilian expatriate sportspeople in Japan
Expatriate footballers in Japan
Sportspeople from Bahia